Neil Jacobson (born 28 April 1977) is an American music executive and former president of Geffen Records, which was later merged to form Interscope Geffen A&M Records under the ownership of Universal Music Group (UMG).  Some of his notable clients while working as an A&R director and international publicist included performers such as Eminem, Snoop Dogg and Black Eyed Peas, as well as notable producers and songwriters, such as Jeff Bhasker, Emile Haynie, King Henry, Bipolar Sunshine, and Alex Salibian.

In December 2019, Jacobson left UMG and created Hallwood Media, an independent music management company, publisher, and record label.

Early life and career
Neil Jacobson was born in Oceanside, New York. He first started playing folk guitar at age seven, and then played drums. At age 15, his focus turned to the music industry. He had been inspired to become a record label executive while working his first job as a caddy at the Deepdale Golf Club. 

 

In 1999, Jacobson attended the Berklee College of Music where he first met Jeff Bhasker. He continued his music education studying percussion at Shenandoah University, formerly Shenandoah College and Conservatory of Music. Upon completion of his studies there, he returned to New York to attend Manhattan School of Music but did not complete his academic studies.

References

1977 births
Living people
American music industry executives
American male songwriters
Songwriters from New York (state)